Thermidava is a toponym used by Ptolemy in relation to a settlement in the route of the Roman army during the Dacian campaign (101-106 CE) of Emperor Trajan. In the context of Ptolemy's narrative the settlement was located along the Lissus-Naissus route (from present-day northern Albania to present-day eastern Serbia). The only other information about the settlement provided is that when Trajan passed through he was "greeted by friendly Dacians". Many locations have been proposed and rejected since the 19th century. A reading of the toponym hinted at a compound of Greek thermos and the Thracian suffix -dava or a toponym derived from Dacian. This led to theories that this was a settlement close to thermal springs and Banja of Peja was proposed as a location, but it has been rejected in modern research. The reference to a -dava settlement within a definitely Illyrian district made its localization within Illyria more unlikely. In contemporary analysis, Ptolemy's account is considered to refer to two different aspects of Trajan's route. Thermidava is most probably a misreading of Theranda (located in Suhareka or Prizren, both in Kosovo). No pro-Roman Dacians have been recorded in the region, nor is their presence considered likely. Most scholars consider Ptolemy's account to refer to a settlement north of the Danube, near the Banat area where the interests of the locals aligned with those of the Romans in the Dacian campaign.

References

Bibliography

See also
List of ancient cities in Illyria

Former populated places in the Balkans
Dacian towns